Cysteodemus is a genus of desert spider beetles in the family Meloidae. There are at least two described species in Cysteodemus.

Species
These two species belong to the genus Cysteodemus:
 Cysteodemus armatus LeConte, 1851 (inflated beetle)
 Cysteodemus wislizeni LeConte, 1851 (black bladder-bodied meloid)

References

Further reading

External links

 

Meloidae
Articles created by Qbugbot